Vasile Ionescu (born 1 January 1922) was a Romanian alpine skier. He competed in two events at the 1948 Winter Olympics.

References

External links
 

1922 births
Possibly living people
Romanian male alpine skiers
Olympic alpine skiers of Romania
Alpine skiers at the 1948 Winter Olympics
People from Bușteni